Palle Mogens Fogde Sørensen (26 March 1927 – 1 February 2018) was a Danish convicted murderer who shot and killed four police officers in 1965 on his way home after a break-in.

Early life 
In 1949, shortly after his release from juvenile detention, Sørensen broke into the headquarters of Danish labor union Dansk Arbejdsmands Forbund (today, 3F), where he blew open a safe with explosives stolen from a quarry and stole 130,000 kr., all of which he spent shortly after.

He later committed several burglaries and instances of insurance fraud, but was eventually caught and received a 5-year prison sentence.

After his release from prison, Sørensen was hired to produce aerials for the army, and for a while managed to bring his criminal lifestyle to a halt. However, in 1964, Sørensen encountered his former cellmate Norman Lee Bune, and resumed his former criminal activities of mainly burglaries.

Sørensen was early on known for his engineer-like prowess with technology and mechanics, and a 1958 article from the tabloid Ekstra Bladet described Sørensen as a man with a skill for cracking safes. He had a gun collection in his mother's basement.

Shootings 
On 17 September 1965 Sørensen and Bune were caught breaking and entering by the house's owner, who subsequently called the police. The men fled the scene and police officers pursued. During the chase, Sørensen reached for his Browning P-35 and shot four policemen, all of whom died from the sustained injuries.

The incident resulted in a major search operation, which ended as he after 48 hours turned himself in, commenting "[I] made the mistake of [my] life."

Sentence 
Sørensen was sentenced to life imprisonment on 24 August 1966. Despite being a peaceful prisoner, he was considered the most dangerous convict in Denmark for many years, and police unions pressured the authorities to grant him neither parole nor pardon.

He was granted parole after 32 years and eight months in prison – at the time the longest period anyone had served in a Danish prison in modern history.

Life after prison 
Sørensen went to live in Valby for the remainder of his life, confessing to a journalist he was still fascinated with safes. He died on 1 February 2018.

Legacy 
Palle Sørensen's crime eventually led to the arming of Danish police officers. The four murdered officers were given State funerals.

References

1927 births
2018 deaths
20th-century Danish criminals
Danish male criminals
Danish mass murderers
Danish people convicted of murdering police officers
Danish people convicted of murder
People from Copenhagen
People convicted of murder by Denmark
Danish prisoners sentenced to life imprisonment
Prisoners sentenced to life imprisonment by Denmark
People paroled from life sentence